Pathways Academy is a Charter School located in Jacksonville, Florida, part of the Duval County Public Schools. It is located in the Downtown Campus of Florida State College at Jacksonville at 101 W. State Street, Suite 3001, which is on the top floor at the college. This school is accredited with Southern Association of Colleges and Schools (SACS).

Graduation Rates
 2006 to 2007: 9 Students Graduating with Exit High School Diplomas.
 2007 to 2008: 25 Students Graduating with Exit High School Diplomas.
 2008-2009: 37 Students Graduating with Exit High School Diplomas.
 2009-2010: 45 Students Graduating with Exit High School Diplomas.

Programs
 Automotive
 Aviation Mechanics
 Building Construction
 Child Care
 Cosmetology
 Distribution
 Fire Science
 Health Care
 Law Enforcement
 Massage Therapy
 Transportation

External links
 Florida State College at Jacksonville
 

Charter schools in Florida
Schools in Florida
Education in Jacksonville, Florida
Educational institutions established in 2006
2006 establishments in Florida